Callichorus or Kallichoros, also called Oxines or Oxinas, was a river of ancient Bithynia. It is mentioned by Pliny the Elder and also by the author of the Periplus of Pseudo-Scylax under the name Callichorus. Under the name Oxinas, it is mentioned by Arrian as draining into the Pontus Euxinus between Heraclea Pontica and Phyllium. Called Oxines by Marcianus, who places its mouth 90 stadia northeast of Cape Posidium.  

It is tentatively identified with the modern Ilık Su.

References

Geography of Bithynia
Rivers of Turkey
Ancient Greek geography